The Hague Jazz is an annual jazz festival held since 2006 in the World Forum Convention Center in The Hague. The festival was first organized in 2006 after the North Sea Jazz festival moved to Rotterdam in the same year. The Hague Jazz is partnered with the Cape Town International Jazz Festival. The festival has been held in the Kyocera Stadium since 2011.

References

External links
Official website

Jazz festivals in the Netherlands
Recurring events established in 2006
2006 establishments in the Netherlands
The Hague Jazz